Kevin Frank O'Halloran (17 January 1915 – 6 October 1976) was an Australian rules footballer who played with St Kilda, South Melbourne and Footscray in the Victorian Football League (VFL).

Family
The son of Simon Patrick O'Halloran (1874-1949), an Barbara Lee Goldsmith (1876-1922), Kevin Francis O'Halloran was born on 17 January 1915.

He married Ida Jean Crawford (1916-1989)in 1940.

His son, Eddie, played with Footscray during the early 1960s.

Football
O'Halloran was a follower, originally from Eaglehawk in the Bendigo Football League. Over the next two seasons he had the unusual distinction of playing for four clubs.

St Kilda (VFL)
He kicked a league equaling record seven goals on his VFL debut, against Footscray at Western Oval.

South Melbourne (VFL)
He was at South Melbourne in 1940.

Yarraville (VFA)
He joined Yarraville in 1940.

Footscray (VFL)
Although he was not cleared from Yarraville, the VFL Permit Committee granted him a permit to play with the VFL team Footscray on 18 June 1941.

Death
He died at his residence in Footscray, Victoria on 6 October 1976.

Notes

External links
 Kevin O'Halloran at The VFA Project.
 Kevin O'Halloran at Boyles Football Photos.

1915 births
Australian rules footballers from Victoria (Australia)
St Kilda Football Club players
Sydney Swans players
Western Bulldogs players
Eaglehawk Football Club players
Yarraville Football Club players
1976 deaths